Borussia Dortmund played the 2002–03 season in the Bundesliga. Aside from failing to retain the Bundesliga title, Dortmund failed to reach the Champions League knockout phase, despite winning away from home against eventual champions Milan. In the end, finishing third in Bundesliga was enough to go into the qualifying phase of the Champions League for the coming season.

Review and events

Players

First-team squad
Squad at end of season

Left club during season

Reserve team

Competitions

Bundesliga

League table

Matches
 Borussia Dortmund-Hertha Berlin 2–2
 0–1 Bart Goor (1)
 1–1 Torsten Frings (4)
 2–1 Ewerthon (36)
 2–2 Andreas Neuendorf (85)
 Bayer Leverkusen-Borussia Dortmund 1–1
 1–0 Diego Placente (23)
 1–1 Jan Koller (61)
 Borussia Dortmund-Stuttgart 3–1
 1–0 Jan Koller (39)
 2–0 Leandro (66)
 2–1 Sean Dundee (76)
 3–1 Ewerthon (88)
 Bochum-Borussia Dortmund 0–0
 Borussia Dortmund-Schalke 04 1–1
 0–1 Victor Agali (69)
 1–1 Ewerthon (70)
 Hansa Rostock-Borussia Dortmund 0–1
 0–1 Jan Koller (12)
 Borussia Dortmund-Mönchengladbach 1–0
 1–0 Ewerthon (85)
 Hannover-Borussia Dortmund 0–3
 0–1 Torsten Frings (42 pen)
 0–2 Jan Koller (63)
 0–3 Márcio Amoroso (87)
 Borussia Dortmund-Arminia Bielefeld 0–0
 Werder Bremen-Borussia Dortmund 1–4
 0–1 Torsten Frings (2)
 1–1 Fabian Ernst (34)
 1–2 Dedê (71)
 1–3 Ewerthon (74)
 1–4 Ewerthon (85)
 Borussia Dortmund-Hamburg 1–1
 1–0 Tomáš Rosický (68)
 1–1 Kim Christensen (88)
 Bayern Munich-Borussia Dortmund 2–1
 0–1 Márcio Amoroso (7)
 1–1 Roque Santa Cruz (62)
 2–1 Claudio Pizarro (66)
 Borussia Dortmund-1860 Munich 1–0
 1–0 Ewerthon (6)
 Wolfsburg-Borussia Dortmund 2–0
 1–0 Diego Klimowicz (19)
 2–0 Diego Klimowicz (55)
 Nürnberg-Borussia Dortmund 1–2
 1–0 David Jarolím (3)
 1–1 Lars Ricken (54)
 1–2 Ewerthon (78)
 Borussia Dortmund-Kaiserslautern 3–1
 1–0 Tomasz Klos (22 og)
 2–0 Márcio Amoroso (74)
 3–0 Márcio Amoroso (77)
 3–1 José Dominguez (86)
 Energie Cottbus-Borussia Dortmund 0–4
 0–1 Jan Koller (8)
 0–2 Ewerthon (47)
 0–3 Márcio Amoroso (83)
 0–4 Jan Koller (90)
 Hertha Berlin-Borussia Dortmund 2–1
 1–0 Pál Dárdai (68)
 1–1 Márcio Amoroso (78)
 2–1 Marcelinho (90)
 Borussia Dortmund-Bayer Leverkusen 2–0
 1–0 Ewerthon (3)
 2–0 Jan Koller (29)
 Stuttgart-Borussia Dortmund 1–0
 1–0 Zvonimir Soldo (75)
 Borussia Dortmund-Bochum 4–1
 0–1 Delron Buckley (8)
 1–1 Giuseppe Reina (33)
 2–1 Jan Koller (43)
 3–1 Torsten Frings (45 pen)
 4–1 Torsten Frings (68 pen)
 Schalke 04-Borussia Dortmund 2–2
 1–0 Sven Vermant (13)
 2–0 Nico van Kerckhoven (16)
 2–1 Jan Koller (52)
 2–2 Ewerthon (58)
 Borussia Dortmund-Hansa Rostock 2–0
 1–0 Dedê (23)
 2–0 Ahmed Reda Madouni (82)
 Mönchengladbach-Borussia Dortmund 1–0
 1–0 Mikael Forssell (63)
 Borussia Dortmund-Hannover 2–0
 1–0 Torsten Frings (33)
 2–0 Leandro (76)
 Arminia Bielefeld-Borussia Dortmund 0–0
 Borussia Dortmund-Werder Bremen 1–2
 1–0 Márcio Amoroso (29)
 1–1 Angelos Charisteas (54)
 1–2 Fabian Ernst (86)
 Hamburg-Borussia Dortmund 1–1
 1–0 Bernardo Romeo (65)
 1–1 Jan Koller (68)
 Borussia Dortmund-Bayern Munich 1–0
 1–0 Márcio Amoroso (61 pen)
 1860 Munich-Borussia Dortmund 0–0
 Borussia Dortmund-Wolfsburg 2–2
 1–0 Lars Ricken (15)
 1–1 Pablo Thiam (59)
 1–2 Pablo Thiam (62)
 2–2 Tomáš Rosický (67)
 Borussia Dortmund-Nürnberg 4–1
 1–0 Lars Ricken (28)
 2–0 Lars Ricken (54)
 3–0 Giuseppe Reina (65)
 4–0 Jan Koller (68)
 4–1 Saša Ćirić (89)
 Kaiserslautern-Borussia Dortmund 0–0
 Borussia Dortmund-Energie Cottbus 1–1
 1–0 Tomáš Rosický (25)
 1–1 Timo Rost (75)

Statistics

Topscorers
  Jan Koller 13
  Ewerthon 11
  Márcio Amoroso 8
  Torsten Frings 6
  Lars Ricken 4

References

Notes

Borussia Dortmund seasons
Borussia Dortmund